Vanity Fair is a 2004 historical drama film directed by Mira Nair and adapted from William Makepeace Thackeray's 1848 novel of the same name. The novel has been the subject of numerous television and film adaptations. Nair's version made notable changes in the development of main character Becky Sharp, played by Reese Witherspoon.

The film received several awards and nominations, including being nominated for the Golden Lion at the 2004 Venice Film Festival.

Plot
In 1802 UK, Becky Sharp, orphaned daughter of a poor painter, has finished her studies and offered to be governess to Sir Pitt Crawley's daughters. Before starting, she travels to London with her close friend Amelia Sedley and family. While there she begins a campaign to charm Amelia's awkward and overweight brother "Jos" Sedley, a wealthy trader living in India. Smitten with Becky, he almost proposes, but is dissuaded by Amelia's snobbish fiancé George Osborne, reminding him that Becky has no dowry.

Not finding a rich husband, Becky takes up her post. Horrified by the house and her employer Sir Pitt, she diligently teaches his daughters and prepares the house for his half-sister Miss Crawley. His youngest son, Rawdon Crawley, an army captain, comes with them and immediately fancies Becky. She manages to secure a post with ill-tempered Miss Crawley.

Meanwhile, Amelia's prospective father-in-law, Mr. Osborne, is trying to arrange a more advantageous marriage for his son George. When George refuses to consider her, Mr. Osborne bankrupts Mr. Sedley, forcing George to break his engagement to Amelia. She now lives in squalor with her family, but hopeful he will come for her, believing the gift of a piano from George's friend Dobbin is from George himself.

Rawdon Crawley and Becky marry secretly, but Miss Crawley soon finds out expelling her from her house and disinheriting Rawdon. George Osborne marries Amelia, rebelling against his father, and is soon after deployed with Dobbin and Rawdon to Belgium, as Napoleon escaped Elba and returned to France. Becky and Amelia accompany their husbands. The newly-wedded Osborne tires of Amelia, and hits on Becky. The ball they are attending is interrupted by an announcement that Napoleon has attacked, and they must march in three hours. Before leaving, Rawdon gives Becky all he's won at cards. The next day, as she tries to flee the city, she sees Amelia in the mob and leaves her carriage to be with her in Brussels, waiting out the battle.

In the ensuing Battle of Waterloo, George is killed and Rawdon survives. Amelia bears his son, also named George. Mr. Osborne refuses to acknowledge his grandson, so Amelia returns to live in poverty with her parents. Now-Major William Dobbin, young George's godfather, continues to show his love for the widowed Amelia by small kindnesses. She is too in love with George's memory to return Dobbin's affections. Saddened, he transfers to an army post in India. Meanwhile, Becky's son is also named after his father.

Several years pass. Rawdon has been passed over for inheritance by both his aunt and father, and they are sinking deep into debt. Amelia struggles to raise her son and reluctantly gives him up to be raised by his grandfather Mr. Osborne, for a fine education and lifestyle. Bailiffs arrive to repossess the Crawleys' furniture, but Becky is saved by their neighbor Lord Steyne, who she remembers from the past as a keen buyer of her father's paintings. He becomes her patron, giving her money and introducing her into London high society.

On the night of her triumphant presentation to King George IV, Becky receives word that Rawdon has been arrested and thrown into debtors' prison. Lord Steyne insists she spend the night with him in return for the services he has rendered her, and Rawdon, after being bailed out by his sister-in-law, walks in on Steyne forcing himself upon Becky. He throws him out, but realizes Becky has been taking money for months in secret without sharing with him. He leaves her, entrusting the care of their son to his older brother, the new Sir Pitt and his wife.

Twelve years later, Becky is a card dealer at a casino in Baden-Baden, Germany. Rawdon died from malaria soon after leaving her, while posted to a tropical island by Lord Steyne. She comes across Amelia's grown son George Jr., who invites her to tea with his mother. Mr. Osborne finally accepted Amelia, leaving her and George Jr. a large inheritance. Becky confronts Amelia over her obsession with the late George, showing her a love note from him to her many years earlier. She urges Amelia to love Dobbin, who has been loyal for many years. Although at first angered, Amelia realizes her mistake and declares her love to Dobbin.

Alone again in the casino, Becky meets Jos Sedley, who has come to Germany after Amelia told him Becky was there. He invites her to come and live in India with him, and she delightedly accepts. They depart to make a new life for themselves.

Cast

Reese Witherspoon as Rebecca "Becky" Sharp Crawley
Angelica Mandy as a young Becky Sharp
Romola Garai as Amelia Sedley Osborne
Sophie Hunter as Maria Osborne
James Purefoy as Colonel Rawdon Crawley
Jonathan Rhys-Meyers as Captain George Henry Osborne
Rhys Ifans as Major William Dobbin
Eileen Atkins as Miss Matilda Crawley
Geraldine McEwan as the Countess of Southdown
Gabriel Byrne as the Marquess of Steyne
Bob Hoskins as Sir Pitt Crawley the Elder
Douglas Hodge as Sir Pitt Crawley the Younger
Natasha Little as Lady Jane Sheepshanks Crawley
John Woodvine as Lord Bareacres
Barbara Leigh-Hunt as Lady Bareacres
Nicholas Jones as Lord Darlington
Sian Thomas as Lady Darlington
Trevor Cooper as General Tufto
Kelly Hunter as the Marchioness of Steyne
Camilla Rutherford as Lady Gaunt
Alexandra Staden as Lady George
Jim Broadbent as Mr. Osborne
Tony Maudsley as Joseph "Jos" Sedley
John Franklyn-Robbins as Mr. John Sedley
Deborah Findlay as Mrs. Mary Sedley
Daniel Hay as little George "Georgy" Osborne the Younger
Tom Sturridge as a young George "Georgy" Osborne the Younger
Kathryn Drysdale as Rhoda Swartz
Ruth Sheen as Miss Pinkerton
Richard McCabe as King George IV
Gledis Cinque as an older Celia Crawley 
William Melling as the young Rawdy Crawley 
Robert Pattinson as an older Sir Rawdon "Rawdy" Crawley the Younger (deleted scenes)

Production
The film adaptation of Vanity Fair had been in development for over 10 years, with writers Matthew Faulk and Mark Skeet working on the screenplay. Mira Nair became attached to the project in 2002 and scrapped most of the initial screenplay. She brought Julian Fellowes in to rewrite the film; he agreed with her that the character of Becky Sharp should be made more sympathetic than in the novel. The ending was also changed, with Becky journeying to India with Joseph Sedley. The film had a budget of $23 million and originally was supposed to be in pre-production for 18 weeks. However, Reese Witherspoon became pregnant so it was necessary to speed up both pre-production and filming. Vanity Fair was shot in Bath, Kent, the Chatham Dockyard, and at Stanway House in Gloucestershire.

Robert Pattinson initially had a small but important role as the grown up son of Becky Sharp. He later revealed that he discovered his scenes were cut during the premiere screening.

Reception
Critics gave the film mixed reviews. On review aggregator website Rotten Tomatoes, the film holds an approval rating of 51% based on 167 reviews, and an average rating of 5.8/10. The website's critical consensus reads, "A more likable Becky Sharp makes for a less interesting movie." On Metacritic, the film has a weighted average score of 53 out of 100, based on 41 critics, indicating "mixed or average reviews".

Stephen Hunter of The Washington Post gave a positive review, calling the movie "Mira Nair's fine movie version of the 1848 book, in all its glory and scope and wit." In the Charlotte Observer, Lawrence Toppman commented that "The filmmakers have wisely retained the main structure of the book" and that "The cast is uniformly good, even when dealing with sudden mood changes forced by the screenwriters' need to move forward." 

Meanwhile, Lisa Schwarzbaum, in her review in Entertainment Weekly, rated the film a B−, and added that "The dismaying switcheroo in director Mira Nair’s adaptation ... that Botoxes Thackeray’s riotous, unruly masterpiece, is that this "Vanity Fair" is, indeed, genteel and inoffensive.  In fact, it borders on perky – a duller, safer tonal choice for the story of a conniving go-getter whose fall is as precipitous as her rise."

Soundtrack
Mira Nair, the director of the film, searched for good Indian musicians to compose a song for the album, and finally selected the trio Shankar-Ehsaan-Loy at the last minute. She showed them a rough footage of the situation she wanted them to compose for, which was the last few sequences of the film. The trio used tabla and several other Indian musical instruments for the song, without any synth, to give it an ethnic feel. The song was sung by Shankar, accompanied by Richa Sharma and Jerry McCulley of Celtic Instruments described the song as "a sprightly duet", while SoundtrackNet said the "aforementioned upbeat vocal number Gori Re" is enjoyable in its own way for one who enjoys Indian musical styles.

Accolades

References

External links

Review at DecentFilms.com

2004 films
2000s historical romance films
2004 romantic drama films
Films set in 1802
American historical romance films
American romantic drama films
British historical romance films
British romantic drama films
Films about families
Films about social class
Films directed by Mira Nair
Films based on Vanity Fair (novel)
Films set in country houses
Films shot at Elstree Film Studios
Films shot in Gloucestershire
Films shot in Kent
Films shot in London
Films shot in Rajasthan
Films shot in Somerset
Films shot in Surrey
Films scored by Mychael Danna
Mirabai Films films
Cultural depictions of George IV
2000s English-language films
2000s American films
2000s British films